Llazar is an Albanian masculine given name and may refer to:
Llazar Fundo (1899–1944), Albanian communist, social-democrat, journalist and writer 
Lazër Mjeda (1869–1935), Albanian prelate of the Roman Catholic Church
Llazar Siliqi (1924–2001), Albanian poet
Llazar Treska (????–19??), Albanian politician and former mayor of Tirana 

Albanian masculine given names